Our Skyy (Our Skyy – ) (translated as Our Skyy - I Want To See The Sky Like That Day) is a 2018 BL Thai television series starring Jumpol Adulkittiporn (Off) and Atthaphan Phunsawat (Gun) (from Senior Secret Love: Puppy Honey), Purim Rattanaruangwattana (Pluem) and Wachirawit Ruangwiwat (Chimon) (from My Dear Loser: Edge of 17), Thanatsaran Samthonglai (Frank) and Sattabut Laedeke (Drake) (from 'Cause You're My Boy), Tawan Vihokratana (Tay) and Thitipoom Techaapaikhun (New) (from Kiss Me Again), and Perawat Sangpotirat (Krist) and Prachaya Ruangroj (Singto) (from SOTUS S: The Series). Produced by GMMTV, it is a five-part series consisting of segments entitled, in order of broadcast, PickRome, InSun, TeeMork, PeteKao, and ArthitKongphop.

It premiered on LINE TV on 23 November 2018, airing on Fridays at 20:00 ICT. The series concluded on 21 December 2018. The series had an re-run from 21 November to 5 December 2021, replacing the timeslot of I'm Tee, Me Too rerun. It will succeeded by F4 Thailand: Boys Over Flowers on its Saturday timeslot and Not Me on Sunday timeslot on GMM25.

Plot 
Our Skyy is a series anthology that consist of five different stories that captures different faces of love. It serves as a sequel, spin-off, continuation and closure to five of the hit Thai boys' love series, Where it the title of every episode was based from every main characters, respectively:

• The first episode titled as #PickRome came from Senior Secret Love: Puppy Honey tackles the relationship of Pick at Rome, after the events of the series, both Pick and Rome are now working adults, Rome working in the café along with his friends, while Pick working in the veterinary clinic. Their lack of time for each other will be the root of chaos and misfortunes to their relationship, will they able to fix it with a help of stones?

• The second episode entitled #InSun from My Dear Loser: Edge of 17, tackling In's return to Sun's life. After the events in the series, In broke up to his girlfriend, When he realized that he really love Sun, In wants to heal Sun's heart and want to get back their relationship. Meanwhile, In will meet Sun's friend, Toey, the two will team up to analyze In's real feelings to Sun, jealousy and denials will come, Will In soothe Sun's wounded heart? With the help of Toey, will Sun found out the real feelings of In and get back where they really are?

• The third episode entitled #TeeMork derived from 'Cause You're My Boy, showcases the blooming relationship of Tee and Mork, three years after the series' events. Tee and Mork are planning their third anniversary individually, along with Morn and Gord. Meanwhile, Mork will do an denials and drama to make an effort for their anniversary with the help of Nae, but instead of an lovely surprise, it will result for Tee to be jealous getting to the point that he created a fake account named Nooknick to test Mork's love and trust. Will their plans work out? Will jealousy continue?

• The fourth one titled as #PeteKao from Kiss Me Again, features Pete and Kao's relationship, after they confessed their relationship on Kiss Me Again, Kao wants to spend time together with Pete, but because of an old woman's warning to Kao, he will do all the ordered of the old woman to keep their relationship goes stronger, Will their relationship goes by? Will love stand strong?

• And lastly, #ArthitKongphop from   SOTUS S: The Series features the good relationship between Arthit and Kongphop, Arthit is still working in a company, while Kongphop is already graduated and waiting for the result of his examination. When Kongphop passed the test, their love will be tested as Kongphop will study abroad for a year for his degree. Will their love continues to strike?  Or it will destroy as they became in a long-distance relationship?

All the questions, will be answered if you tune in to them.

Cast and characters 
Below are the cast of the series:

PickRome 
This aired on 23 November 2018.

Main 
 Jumpol Adulkittiporn (Off) as Pick
 Atthaphan Phunsawat (Gun) as Rome

Supporting 
 Weerayut Chansook (Arm) as Good
 Phongsathorn Padungktiwong (Green) as Pao
 Petchbuntoon Pongphan (Louis) as Nueng
 Sarocha Burintr (Gigie) as Jay

InSun 
This aired on 30 November 2018.

Main 
 Purim Rattanaruangwattana (Pluem) as In
 Wachirawit Ruangwiwat (Chimon) as Sun

Supporting 
 Chinrat Siripongchawalit (Mike) as Toey

TeeMork 
This aired on 7 December 2018.

Main 
 Thanatsaran Samthonglai (Frank) as Tee
 Sattabut Laedeke (Drake) as Mork

Supporting 
 Phuwin Tangsakyuen as Morn
 Trai Nimtawat (Neo) as Gord
 Phatchara Tubthong (Kapook) as Nae

Guest role 
 Chayapol Jutamat (AJ) as Ton
 Thanawat Rattanakitpaisarn (Khaotung) as Au

PeteKao 
This aired on 14 December 2018.

Main 
 Tawan Vihokratana (Tay) as Pete
 Thitipoom Techaapaikhun (New) as Kao

Guest role 
 Tatchakorn Boonlapayanan (Godji)

ArthitKongphop 
This aired on 21 December 2018.

Main 
 Perawat Sangpotirat (Krist) as Arthit
 Prachaya Ruangroj (Singto) as Kongphop

Supporting 
 Korn Khunatipapisiri (Oaujun) as Tew
 Ployshompoo Supasap (Jan) as Praepailin
 Neen Suwanamas as May
 Naradon Namboonjit (Prince) as Oak
 Chanagun Arpornsutinan (Gunsmile) as Prem
 Natthawaranthorn Khamchoo as Tutah

Guest role 
 Sivakorn Lertchuchot (Guy) as Yong

Notes

References

External links 
 Our Skyy on GMM 25 website 
 Our Skyy  on LINE TV
 
 GMMTV

Television series by GMMTV
Thai romantic comedy television series
Thai drama television series
2019 Thai television series debuts
2019 Thai television series endings
Line TV original programming
Thai boys' love television series